American Splendor is a 2003 American biographical comedy-drama film about Harvey Pekar, the author of the American Splendor comic book series. The film, which is a hybrid production featuring live actors, documentary, and animation, is in part an adaptation of the comics, which dramatize Pekar's life. American Splendor was written and directed by documentarians Shari Springer Berman and Robert Pulcini.

The film stars Paul Giamatti as Pekar and Hope Davis as Joyce Brabner. It also features appearances from Pekar and Brabner themselves (along with Pekar's long-time co-worker Toby Radloff), who discuss their lives, the comic books, and how it feels to be depicted onscreen by actors. It was filmed entirely on location in Cleveland and Lakewood in Ohio.

Plot 

The film opens in the year 1950. It's Halloween and an 11-year-old Harvey Pekar refuses to dress up as a superhero while trick-or-treating. The scene shifts to an adult, walking the gritty Cleveland streets. Then real Harvey Pekar appears in a documentary-style setup.

The narrative picks up again in 1975, as a scratchy-voiced Harvey visits a throat doctor and exhibits hypochondria. Harvey's wife decides their "plebeian" lifestyle just isn't working for her anymore; without being able to speak, Harvey is powerless to convince her not to leave him. A few months later, a depressed Harvey is at his file clerk job at the VA hospital. Mr. Boats comes by to offer advice: the words of an Elinor Wylie poem.

In a documentary scene, the real Harvey Pekar talks about his years as a part-time used-record collector/salesman. The narrative flashes back to 1962. While searching for old records at a yard sale, Harvey meets shy greeting card illustrator Robert Crumb. A friendship is formed over a shared love of jazz and comic books.

Returning to 1975, a now famous Crumb is back in Cleveland for a visit. His marriage over, Harvey is lonely and frustrated — he wants to leave a mark on the world. Afterward, a sobering moment in the VA hospital's "deceased" files section leads Harvey to try drawing his own stories, but his lack of drawing talent stops him. An incident at the supermarket revives him, as his animated subconscious goads him: "Are you going to stand there in silence, or are you going to make a mark?" Inspired, Harvey stays up all night writing. At a diner with Crumb, Harv makes a pitch for a new kind of comics. He shows Bob the scripts he's been working on, and Crumb offers to illustrate them for him.

A montage of classic Pekar quotidian moments culminates with Harvey proudly showing off American Splendor #1 to his VA co-workers. The narrative moves forward to 1984. Harvey has published eight issues of American Splendor to critical acclaim but little financial gain; he's still a "flunky file clerk." Harvey runs into Alice Quinn, a woman he briefly knew in college. They catch up on each other's lives and talk about Theodore Dreiser's novel Jennie Gerhardt. Harvey leaves their encounter feeling more alone than ever before.

Meanwhile, in Delaware, Joyce is frustrated with her partner in the comic book store, who has sold her copy of American Splendor #8 out from under her. She writes to Harvey, he responds, and they discover they are kindred spirits. Joyce travels to Cleveland to meet Harvey in person. The date begins with a handshake and dinner at a local family restaurant. Back at Harvey's apartment, Joyce is overcome with a bout of nausea and vomiting. A concerned Harvey offers her chamomile tea. Charmed, Joyce suggests they "skip the whole courtship thing" and get married.

It's one week later, and Harvey sees his VA colleague Toby Radloff sitting in his car eating White Castle sliders. Toby is on his way to Toledo to see the new movie Revenge of the Nerds. Meanwhile, Harvey is on his way to Delaware to marry Joyce and help her move out to Cleveland.

Sitting alongside the real Harvey, the real Joyce Brabner talks about what it was like to become a character in Harvey's stories.

Now married, Harvey and Joyce go to a screening of Revenge of the Nerds with Toby. Joyce and Toby found the film inspiring, and Harvey found it insipid. Back at their apartment, Joyce struggles with feeling at home amidst all of Harvey's stuff. Their spat is interrupted by a message from a theater producer who wants to make American Splendor into a play. Harvey and Joyce travel to Los Angeles to see American Splendor: The Play. Things are finally breaking Harvey's way. But his ascendancy is complicated by Joyce's emotional struggles. She wants a family. Her desires are put aside again because a producer calls to offer Harvey a chance to be a guest on Late Night with David Letterman.

Almost despite himself, Harvey is a hit on the show and comes back for multiple appearances. Meanwhile, Toby becomes an MTV star. Back in Cleveland, a man recognizes Harvey from the Letterman show, but not for the "right" reasons. Harvey is angry and unfulfilled. Meanwhile, Joyce is looking for fulfillment of her own, as a creator and as an activist. Against Harvey's wishes, she goes away to a peace conference, leaving him at loose ends. One lonely night, Harvey discovers a mysterious lump on his groin.

Joyce is still away on her mission, and a scared and bitter Harvey makes another appearance on the Letterman show. He dons an "On Strike Against NBC" shirt and the show goes downhill from there, winding up in chaos. Joyce finally returns, but she discovers Harvey's lump. Harvey is diagnosed with lymphoma. Joyce suggest he make a comic book of the whole thing, but Harvey just wants to die. Undeterred, Joyce enlists Fred, an artist, to illustrate the experience. Fred brings along his daughter Danielle on their first brainstorming session, and Joyce is smitten with the girl. Harvey reluctantly agrees to participate in the comic, and asks Fred to keep bringing Danielle along.

Harvey's treatment is traumatic and tumultuous. One night, an addled Harvey wonders if he's real or if he is just a character in a comic book, and whether the story will end or continue if he dies. In one continuous take, Harvey wanders through a dreamscape, musing about other individuals he finds in the Cleveland telephone book that are also named Harvey Pekar.

One year later, Harvey and Joyce sign the completed Our Cancer Year. Harvey is declared cancer-free. They adopt Danielle, and Harvey adjusts to being a parent. The real Harvey retires from the VA hospital, and the movie ends with a group hug.

Cast
 Paul Giamatti as Harvey Pekar
 Daniel Tay as young Harvey
 Donal Logue as stage actor Harvey
 Hope Davis as Joyce Brabner
 Molly Shannon as stage actor Joyce
 Judah Friedlander as Toby Radloff
 James Urbaniak as Robert Crumb
 Harvey Pekar as himself
 Joyce Brabner as herself
 Toby Radloff as himself
 Earl Billings as Mr. Boats
 Maggie Moore as Alice Quinn
 James McCaffrey as Fred
 Madylin Sweeten as Danielle
 Gary Dumm (a long-time illustrator for American Splendor) as The Extra (in a suede jacket), who asks Pekar for his autograph in the Our Cancer Year book-signing scene 
 Eytan Mirsky as The Guitarist
 Josh Hutcherson as Kid dressed as Robin (his first feature film appearance)
 Chris Ambrose as kid dressed as Superman
 Shari Springer Berman (voice) as Interviewer
 Robert Pulcini as Bob the director

Production
The film was originally intended to be screened on HBO. The script was written before the September 11 attacks, was cast right afterward, and shot in about a month in the fall of 2001.

Though Shari Springer Berman and Robert Pulcini had directed documentaries before, American Splendor was their first narrative feature. Of the film's alternating of fictional portrayals with real-life appearances by Pekar and his friends and family, co-writer/co-director Pulcini recalled, 
 Berman added that upon meeting Pekar they felt compelled to include him in the film:

Artwork from actual American Splendor comics and Our Cancer Year appears in the film; some scenes use artwork replicated by cartoonist Doug Allen. Animated sequences were produced by Gary Leib.

At one point, Pekar meta-references the structure of the film by doing a voice-over for a one-shot of Paul Giamatti playing him by saying "There's our guy. Well, it's me. Or the guy playing me. Though he don't look nothing like me, but whatever." (Pekar and Brabner had been approached previously by actors interested in playing Pekar on film, including Rob Schneider.)

David Letterman refused to appear in the film, and his old network of NBC did not allow the filmmakers to use footage of Pekar's disastrous fourth and sixth appearances on Late Night (aired July 31, 1987 and August 31, 1988, respectively), though they had no problems with the other Pekar appearances that are shown in the film. The supposed "final appearance" was done using oblique camera angles and a voiced-over audio of the incident. (In actuality, Pekar returned for two more appearances on the Letterman show in 1993 & 1994.)

The film's original production budget was $1.5 million, and as the film was coming together, HBO gave the filmmakers more money for post-production, animation, and music.

Music 
Mark Suozzo wrote the film's score.

Music played in the film mostly reflects Pekar's affection for avant-garde jazz and American music from the 1920s and 1930s. A couple of songs by American Splendor illustrator Robert Crumb and his band are also featured.

The American Splendor (Original Motion Picture Soundtrack) was released by New Line Records in 2003, and featured the following songs:

 "Paniots Nine" — Joe Maneri
 "Blue Devil Jump" — Jay McShann
 "Chasin' Rainbows" — R. Crumb & His Cheap Suit Serenaders
 "On the Sunny Side of the Street" — Lester Young with the Oscar Peterson Trio
 "Oh, Lady Be Good!" — Dizzy Gillespie
 "Ain't That Peculiar" — Marvin Gaye
 "Looking Suite: The Shortest Weekend / After Alice (So Sweet, So Sad)" — Mark Suozzo/Global Stage Orchestra
 "Stardust" — Dizzy Gillespie
 "Hula Medley" — R. Crumb & His Cheap Suit Serenaders
 "T'aint Nobody's Bizness If I Do" — Jay McShann
 "My Favorite Things" — John Coltrane
 "Time Passes Strangely: Cancer Treatment / Retirement Party" — Mark Suozzo
 "Ain't That Peculiar" — Chocolate Genius

The following songs — in whole, or in part — are used diegetically in the film:
 "Soul Power" — Captain
 "Big Ed" — Mark Cherrie
 "Know Your Rights" — The Clash

 "Escape (The Piña Colada Song)" — Rupert Holmes
 "American Splendor" — Eytan Mirsky
 "Silent Morning" — Noel
 "All Black and White" — written by Clair Marlo & Alexander "Ace" Baker
 "I'll Be With You in Apple Blossom Time" — The Andrews Sisters
 "My City Was Gone" — The Pretenders

Reception
On Rotten Tomatoes, the film has a 94% rating based on reviews from 186 critics, with an average rating of 8.3/10. The website's critical consensus reads, "Exhilarating both stylistically and for its entertaining, moving portrayal of an everyman, American Splendor is a portrait of a true underground original." On Metacritic, the film has a weighted average score of 90 out of 100, based on 42 reviews, indicating "universal acclaim."

Roger Ebert awarded the film four stars out of four in his review, calling it a "magnificently audacious movie, in which fact and fiction sometimes coexist in the same frame." He remarked "the casting of Giamatti and Davis is perfect", writing that they "mastered not only the looks but the feels and even the souls of these two people", as well as praising Friedlander's performance. He also found the film "delightful in the way it finds its own way to tell its own story", describing its presentation as "mesmerizing in the way it lures us into the daily hopes and fears of this Cleveland family."

American Splendor won the Grand Jury Prize for Dramatic Film at the 2003 Sundance Film Festival, in addition to the award for Best Adapted Screenplay from the Writers Guild of America. At the 2003 Cannes Film Festival, the film received the FIPRESCI critics award. American Splendor was given the Guardian New Directors Award at the 2003 Edinburgh International Film Festival. It was also nominated for Best Adapted Screenplay at the 2003 Academy Awards.

Columnist Jaime Wolf wrote a laudatory review of the film in Slate, also drawing attention to formal parallels with Woody Allen's Annie Hall and his other films.

Harvey Pekar wrote about the effects of the film in various stories published in American Splendor: Our Movie Year (2004).

Accolades

References

External links

 
 
 
 
 Paul Giamatti interview for American Splendor
 Overview of the film and the comics that inspired it by Peter Sanderson
 Review of American Splendor by J. Hoberman of The Village Voice (August 12, 2003)
 Scene by Scene with Josh & Dean, an American Splendor movie podcast co-hosted by two former American Splendor illustrators

2003 films
2003 biographical drama films
2003 comedy-drama films
2003 independent films
2000s American films
2000s English-language films
American biographical drama films
American comedy-drama films
American independent films
Biographical films about writers
Comedy-drama films based on actual events
Cultural depictions of American men
Cultural depictions of cartoonists
Cultural depictions of writers
Dark Horse Entertainment films
Films about cancer
Films about comics
Films based on American comics
Films directed by Shari Springer Berman and Robert Pulcini
Films set in Cleveland
Films shot in Cleveland
HBO Films films
Live-action films based on comics
National Society of Film Critics Award for Best Film winners
Self-reflexive films
Sundance Film Festival award winners